Ujan in Iran may refer to:
 Ujan, Alborz
 Ujan, Fars
 Ujan-e Gharbi Rural District, in East Azerbaijan Province
 Ujan-e Sharqi Rural District, in East Azerbaijan Province